Amblyseius shiganus is a species of mite in the family Phytoseiidae.

References

shiganus
Articles created by Qbugbot
Animals described in 1972